The 1951 football season was São Paulo's 22nd season since the club's founding in 1930.

Overall

{|class="wikitable"
|-
|Games played || 47 (7 Torneio Rio-São Paulo, 28 Campeonato Paulista, 12 Friendly match)
|-
|Games won || 22 (0 Torneio Rio-São Paulo, 17 Campeonato Paulista, 5 Friendly match)
|-
|Games drawn || 8 (2 Torneio Rio-São Paulo, 3 Campeonato Paulista, 3 Friendly match)
|-
|Games lost || 17 (5 Torneio Rio-São Paulo, 8 Campeonato Paulista, 4 Friendly match)
|-
|Goals scored || 90
|-
|Goals conceded || 64
|-
|Goal difference || +34
|-
|Best result || 6–1 (A) v Comercial - Campeonato Paulista - 1951.12.09
|-
|Worst result || 0–4 (A) v Corinthians - Campeonato Paulista - 1951.08.26
|-
|Most appearances || 
|-
|Top scorer || 
|-

Friendlies

São Paulo / Bangu tour to Europe 

A combined São Paulo-Bangu also traveled across Europe. Games were played with nine wins, two draws and two defeats. And it all started in the Italian city of Genoa on the 29 March and ended in Lisbon, Portugal on the 29 April. Cariocas and São Paulo visited eight countries. The coach was Leônidas da Silva, manager of São Paulo.

Official competitions

Torneio Rio-São Paulo

Record

Campeonato Paulista

Record

External links
official website

References

Association football clubs 1951 season
1951
1951 in Brazilian football